Meiosimyza platycephala is a species of small flies of the family Lauxaniidae.

References

Lauxaniidae
Muscomorph flies of Europe
Taxa named by Hermann Loew
Insects described in 1847